The Ssh-36 (from стальной шлем, stal'noy shlem) was a steel combat helmet developed and used by the Red Army. It was designed by Aleksandr A. Shvartz, and began production in 1936.  Its large front rim and wide flares over the ears provided good protection for the wearer.  The German M35, introduced a year before the Russian SSh-36, served as a model for the development of the SSh-36. The SSh-36 was also fitted with a comb on top, which allowed for ventilation. There were also apocryphal claims that the comb was designed to deflect saber blows.

Early SSh-36s were made with fragile leather linings.  Due to the unreliability of these early models containing leather linings, later variations were introduced with cloth linings.  Similar problems were also encountered with early leather chinstraps, so the leather chinstraps were phased out in favor of cloth models as well.  Throughout their production four sizes were produced: small, medium, large, and extra large.
The SSh-36 was worn by Soviet soldiers in several campaigns of the late 1930s and 1940s, including the Khalkin Gol campaign against the Japanese in 1939 (giving it the nickname "Khalkingolka"), the Finnish Winter War of 1939–1940, the 1939 invasion of Poland, the 1940 invasions of the Baltic states and Bessarabia, and in World War II, or as it is known in Russia, the Great Patriotic War.  It was also distributed to the Republican soldiers of the Spanish Civil War in conjunction with Soviet support of the Spanish government.

Production of the SSh-36 ended in 1941. Today it is a rare and expensive item for its collectors.

References

Combat helmets of Russia
Soviet military uniforms
1936 introductions
Military equipment introduced in the 1930s